Agrippina Yakovlevna Vaganova (26 June 1879 – 5 November 1951) was a Soviet and Russian ballet teacher who developed the Vaganova method – the technique which derived from the teaching methods of the old Imperial Ballet School (today the Vaganova Academy of Russian Ballet) under the Premier Maître de Ballet Marius Petipa throughout the mid to late 19th century, though mostly throughout the 1880s and 1890s. It was Vaganova who perfected and cultivated this form of teaching the art of classical ballet into a workable syllabus. Her Fundamentals of the Classical Dance (1934) remains a standard textbook for the instruction of ballet technique. Her technique is one of the most popular techniques today.

Biography
Vaganova was born in Saint Petersburg to Akop Vaganov, an Armenian from Astrakhan, who worked as an usher at the Mariinsky Theatre, and a Russian mother.

Vaganova's whole life was connected with the Imperial Ballet (later the Kirov Ballet) of the Mariinsky Theatre in Saint Petersburg. She was accepted into the Imperial Ballet School in 1888, the great institution of classical dance founded by Anna of Russia and funded by the Tsars. She graduated from the Classe de Perfection of the former Prima Ballerina Evgenia Pavlovna Sokolova (she was also trained by Yekaterina Vazem, Christian Johansson, Lev Ivanov, Nikolai Legat and Pavel Gerdt).

Ballet did not come easily to Vaganova in her first years as a student, but slowly, through the efforts of her own will power, she was able to join the illustrious Imperial Ballet upon her graduation. By the time she attained the rank of soloist, Saint Petersburg balletomanes dubbed her queen of variations, for her unlimited virtuosity and level of technique.

The old Maestro Petipa cared little for Vaganova as a dancer – any mention of her performances in his diaries was usually followed by such comments as "awful" or "dreadful". In 1915 the Ballet Master Nikolai Legat cast Vaganova as the Goddess Niriti in his revival of Petipa's 1889 grand ballet The Talisman. Vaganova's portrayal was a great success, and won her promotion to the rank of Prima. Nevertheless, she chose to retire one year later to concentrate on teaching.

She started to teach ballet in 1916 at the School of the Baltic Fleet which was founded and led by Akim Volynsky. In 1921 Vaganova began teaching at the Choreographic College, so at that time was called the former Imperial Theater School situated on Rossi street (after the revolution ballet department was separated from the Drama and Music). Though she did have a respectable career as a dancer, her leadership in teaching classical dance was what gave her one of the most respected places in the history of ballet. Her own early struggle with deciphering ballet technique had taught her much. She taught students who would go on to become legends of the dance.

After the October Revolution the future of ballet in Russia looked grim because of its tradition as court entertainment. Vaganova "fought tooth and nail", as she put it, for the preservation of the legacy of Marius Petipa and the Imperial Ballet. From 1931 to 1937 she was an artistic director of the ballet of the Leningrad Opera and Ballet Theater (Kirov Ballet). In 1933, she staged the classical version of Swan Lake by Lev Ivanov and Marius Petipa with Galina Ulanova as Odette, Olga Jordan as Odile and Konstantin Sergeyev as Prince Siegfried. In 1935 she revived La Esmeralda partly with her own choreography.

In 1934 she published her famous book Fundamentals of Classical Dance: it has withstood at least six editions in Russia and was translated into many languages. The same year Vaganova (along with Boris Shavrov) initiated the establishing at the Leningrad Conservatory of pedagogic department for training of future ballet teachers which she began to manage. There, some of her dance school alumni became her students.

Among Vaganova's dance alumnae were the distinguished Soviet ballerinas Marina Semyonova, Galina Ulanova, Natalia Dudinskaya, Alla Shelest, Ninel Kurgapkina, Alla Osipenko and Irina Kolpakova among many others.

Her teaching combined the elegant, refined style of the old French School which Vaganova had been taught by Christian Johansson, the beauty and smoothness of the arms movements of old Russian School, strong and masterly feet technique of Italian School with more vigorous dancing developed in the Soviet Union. Her last school graduation was in 1951 — not long before her death.

She also taught the class of perfection for the female dancers of the Kirov Ballet for many years till 1951, when Natalia Dudinskaya succeed her as teacher.
 
Shortly after her death, on 1 November 1951, the Choreographic College on Rossi Street was renamed in her honor; in 1961, it received the title of "academic" and in 1991 it began to use the name Vaganova Academy of Russian Ballet.

See also
List of dancers
List of Russian ballet dancers

References

External links
The Ballerina Gallery – Agrippina Vaganova

1879 births
1951 deaths
Choreographers of Mariinsky Theatre
People's Artists of the RSFSR
Stalin Prize winners
Recipients of the Order of the Red Banner of Labour
Ballerinas from the Russian Empire
Ballet teachers
Educators from the Russian Empire
Soviet ballerinas
Soviet educators
Vaganova graduates
People from the Russian Empire of Armenian descent